Franziska is a given name. Notable people with the name include:

 Franziska Albl (born 1995), German ice hockey player
 Franziska Baumann (born 1965), Swiss musician and composer
 Franziska Becskehazy (born 1966), Brazilian cross-country skier
 Franziska Bertels (born 1986), German bobsledder
 Franziska Boas (1902–1988), American dancer
 Franziska Brantner (born 1979), German politician
 Franziska Brauße (born 1998), German racing cyclist
 Franziska Buch (born 1960), German film director and screenwriter
 Franziska Busch (born 1985), German ice hockey forward
 Franziska Donner (1900–1992), inaugural First Lady of South Korea
 Franziska Drohsel (born 1980), German politician
 Franziska Ehmcke (born 1947), professor
 Franziska Ellmenreich (1847–1931), German stage actress
 Franziska Emmerling (born 1975), German chemist
 Franziska Fischer (born 1968), German journalist, TV presenter, and author
 Franziska Fritz (born 1991), German bobsledder
 Franziska Giffey (born 1978), German politician 
 Franziska Gminder (born 1945), German politician
 Franziska Goltz (born 1985), German sports sailor
 Franziska Gottwald, German mezzo-soprano singer
 Franziska Grieder, Swiss-American veterinary scientist
 Franziska Gritsch (born 1997), Austrian World Cup alpine ski racer
 Franziska Gude (born 1976), field hockey midfielder
 Franziska Heinz (born 1972), East German and German female handball player
 Franziska Hennes (born 1992), professional squash player
 Franziska Hentke (born 1989), German butterfly swimmer
 Franziska Hentschel (born 1970), former field hockey forward from Germany
 Franziska Hildebrand (born 1987), German biathlete
 Franziska Hofmann (born 1994), German athlete
 Franziska Huhn (born 1977), German harpist
 Franziska Huth (born 1987), German singer of Eyes of Eden
 Franziska Jöhr, former Swiss curler
 Franziska Kaufmann (born 1987), Swiss curler
 Franziska Kessel (1906–1934), German politician
 Franziska Kinz (1897–1980), Austrian film actress
 Franziska Knuppe (born 1974), German model
 Franziska Koch (cyclist) (born 2000), German cyclist
 Franziska Konitz (born 1986), German judoka
 Franziska Liebhardt (born 1982), Paralympic athlete from Germany
 Franziska Liebing (1899–1993), German actress
 Franziska Maichle (born 1992), German singer
 Franziska Mally (born 1916), Austrian swimmer
 Franziska Martienssen-Lohmann (1887–1971), German soprano
 Franziska Meissner-Diemer, German columnist.
 Franziska Mietzner (born 1988), German handballer
 Franziska Möllinger (1817–1880), German-born Swiss photographer
 Franziska Müller (born 1990), German handballer
 Franziska Nisch (1882–1913), German Roman Catholic nun
 Franziska Oehme (born 1944), German actress
 Franziska Peer (born 1987), Austrian sport shooter
 Franziska Petri (born 1973), German actress
 Franziska Pigulla (1964–2019), German actress, news presenter, and voice actress
 Franziska Preuß (born 1994), German biathlete
 Franziska Reindl (born 1982), German ice hockey player
 Franziska Rochat-Moser (1966–2002), long-distance runner from Switzerland
 Franziska Romana Koch (1748–1796), German ballet dancer, soprano, and actress
 Franziska Scanagatta (1776–1865), Italian woman who disguised herself as a man in order to attend an Austrian officer school
 Franziska Schenk (born 1974), former German speed skater
 Franziska Schlopsnies (1884–1944), German fashion, poster, and graphic designer
 Franziska Schreiber (born 1990), German politician
 Franziska Sontag (1788–1865), German operatic soprano and theater's actress
 Franziska Stading (1763–1836), Swedish opera singer
 Franziska Stark (born 1961), German pool player
 Franziska Steffen (born 1989), Indonesian-born Swiss freestyle skier
 Franziska Szegöffy (1816–1882), stage actor
 Franziska Tausig (1890s–1989), Austrian author
 Franziska Tiburtius (1843–1927), German doctor
 Franziska Traub (born 1962), German actress
 Franziska Troegner (born 1954), German actress
 Franziska van Almsick (born 1978), German swimmer
 Franziska Volkmann (born 1994), German female badminton player
 Franziska von Corvin-Krasinsk, Polish noblewoman
 Franziska von Hohenheim (1748–1811), German noblewoman
 Franziska von Känel, a former Swiss curler
 Franziska von Reitzenstein (1834–1896), German novelist
 Franziska Walser (born 1950), German actress
 Franziska Weber (born 1989), German sprint canoer
 Franziska Weisz (born 1980), Austrian actress
 Franziska zu Königsegg-Aulendorf (1797–1872), German noblewoman

See also 
 Franziska (disambiguation)
 Fränzi